Richard von Sturmer (born 1957) is an artist, poet, playwright, film-maker, and musician from New Zealand. He was born in Devonport, North Auckland.

His poetry and prose has appeared in journals such as The New Zealand Listener, brief, Landfall, Sport, and Zen Bow.

In music, von Sturmer fronted New Zealand punk/art band The Plague, continued with The Humanimals, Avante Garde and wrote the lyrics for Blam Blam Blam's anti-Robert Muldoon song "There Is No Depression In New Zealand", which has been described as a 'classic alternative national anthem.' The Plague are particularly known for their 1979 performance at the Nambassa festival, where four members (including von Sturmer) appeared naked apart from body paint.

Richard von Sturmer is a Zen Buddhist, who gave up eating meat when he was 16. He studied for ten years at the Rochester Zen Center in New York.

Von Sturmer is married to Sensei Amala Wrightson (previously Charlotte Wrightson), with whom he co-founded the Auckland Zen Centre.

From 2014, von Sturmer has worked with film-maker Gabriel White as the duo The Floral Clocks, with von Sturmer writing lyrics which White set to music. These songs were released as an album Desert Fire, mostly performed by White alone. A second album, A Beautiful Shade of Blue was released in 2017, and their third Gas Giant was released in 2019.

Plays and film scripts 
Von Sturmer was involved with the following plays and film scripts:
 1976. Circadian Rhythms (dir: David Blythe)
 1980. The Green Lion
 1981. The Search for Otto

Published collections of writing 
Von Sturmer has published the following collections of writing:
 1988. We Xerox Your Zebras
 1991. A Network of Dissolving Threads  
 1998. Images From The Center (with photographer Joseph Sorrentino)
 2005. Suchness: Zen Poetry and Prose
 2009. On the Eve of Never Departing 
 2011. The Book of Equanimity Verses
 2016. This Explains Everything (memoir)

Exhibitions 
Von Sturner has had the following exhibitions:
 1987 The Search for Otto in “Recent New Zealand Films”, Japan.
 1990. The Search for Otto in “Images in Motion”. New Plymouth. 
 2007. 24 Tanka Films. Wellington. New Zealand Film Institute.
 2010. Rubble Emits Light. Auckland. (Retrospective). 
 2011. The Stone Age Dream of Headstones. Auckland. (Group show)

References

External links 
 Electronic Poetry Centre site
 Auckland Zen Centre website.

1957 births
Living people
20th-century New Zealand poets
Zen Buddhists
New Zealand musicians